"Gimme Love" is a song by Japanese singer-songwriter Joji. It was released on 16 April 2020 through 88rising, as the third single from Joji's second studio album Nectar (2020).

Composition 
The track is composed of two parts. The first half, produced by Joji, is described as a "sticky pop anthem with haunting vocals", while the second half, produced by Bēkon and The Donuts, is described as "somber" and "orchestral".

Charts

Weekly charts

Year-end charts

Certifications

References 

2020 singles
2020 songs
Joji (musician) songs
2020s ballads
Pop ballads
Japanese pop songs
Indietronica songs
Soul ballads
Gospel songs